This article is a list of historic places in Estrie, Quebec, entered on the Canadian Register of Historic Places, whether they are federal, provincial, or municipal. All addresses are the administrative Region 05. For all other listings in the province of Quebec, see List of historic places in Quebec.

Estrie
Estrie